Zambana (La Zambàna in local dialect) is a comune (municipality) in Trentino in the northern Italian region Trentino-Alto Adige/Südtirol, located about  north of Trento.

Zambana borders the following municipalities: Mezzolombardo, Fai della Paganella, Nave San Rocco, Lavis, Andalo and Terlago.

Demographic evolution

References

External links
 Homepage of the city

Cities and towns in Trentino-Alto Adige/Südtirol